Marinobacter guineae is a Gram-negative, aerobic and moderately halophilic bacterium from the genus of Marinobacter which has been isolated from the South Shetland Islands from the Antarctica.

References

External links
Type strain of Marinobacter guineae at BacDive -  the Bacterial Diversity Metadatabase

Further reading 
 

Alteromonadales
Bacteria described in 2008